The Hundred of Andersfield is one of the 40 historical Hundreds in the ceremonial county of Somerset, England, dating from before the Norman conquest during the Anglo-Saxon era although exact dates are unknown.

Area
It contained the parishes of Broomfield, Chilton Trinity, Creech St Michael, Durleigh, Enmore, Goathurst, Lyng and, from the 1670s, the Petherton limit tithing of North Petherton.

References

External links
 Andersfield Hundred - British History Online

Andersfield